William "Billy" Campfield (born August 20, 1956) is a former American football running back in the National Football League for the Philadelphia Eagles and the New York Giants. He played in Super Bowl XV in 1981. He played college football at the University of Kansas and was drafted in the eleventh round of the 1978 NFL Draft.

Early years
Campfield graduated from Derby High School in Derby, Kansas, in 1974. He was a four-year letterman as a running back at Kansas, averaging over 6 yards every time he touched the ball and scoring 12 career touchdowns.

Professional career

Philadelphia Eagles
Campfield was drafted by the Philadelphia Eagles in the eleventh round of the 1978 NFL Draft. He was waived on August 22, 1983.

New York Giants
Campfield was claimed off waivers by the New York Giants, and he was released a week later on August 29, 1983.

San Antonio Gunslingers
Campfield signed a one-year contract with the San Antonio Gunslingers, and one week later, on March 6, 1984, announced his retirement.

Arizona Outlaws
Campfield came out of retirement and signed with the Arizona Outlaws on February 12, 1985.

References

1956 births
Living people
Sportspeople from Las Vegas
Players of American football from Nevada
Players of American football from Kansas
American football running backs
Kansas Jayhawks football players
University of Kansas alumni
Philadelphia Eagles players
New York Giants players
San Antonio Gunslingers players
Arizona Outlaws players